Dimple Jhangiani (born 24 February 1990, in India) is an Indian television actress. Her first appearance in Tellywood began with her playing the role of Kanya in the serial Kuchh Is Tara on Sony Entertainment Television. Dimple Jhangiani had joined Kis Desh Mein Hai Mera Dil and played the role of Sanjana as Harshad Chopda's (Prem) close friend. She also played RajKumari Sandhya in Raja Ki Aayegi Baraat. She played the role of Nimrit in Life OK's Amrit Manthan as the lead but she was replaced by Ankita Sharma due to the story. After her exit from Amrit Manthan she did a short telefilm on StarPlus, Teri Meri Love Stories.

She re-entered the show Amrit Manthan as Nimrit's twin sister Shivangi. After Amrit Manthan she roped on to play the character of Minty in Colors TV Mrs. Pammi Pyarelal. In 2013, Jhangiani played the role, Barkat Abdullah, in Beintehaa which aired on Colors TV.

After taking a break from getting married, Jhangiani returned to screens in Meri Durga which started airing on StarPlus in 2017.

Personal life
Jhangiani is married to Sunny Asrani. Jhangiani, after getting married, changed her name to Anaisha Asrani because it brings good luck to the couple.

Television

References

External links 
Kabhi Kabhii Pyaar Kabhi Kabhii Yaar Official Site

Living people
21st-century Indian actresses
Actresses from Mumbai
Indian soap opera actresses
Indian television actresses
1990 births